Ottawa–Rideau was a short lived provincial electoral district in Ottawa, Ontario. It elected one member to the Legislative Assembly of Ontario. It was created in 1987 and was abolished in 1999 into Ottawa South, Nepean–Carleton, Ottawa West–Nepean and Ottawa Centre.

The riding included all of pre-amalgamation Ottawa south of Walkley Road south of Baseline Road. It also included part of the city of Gloucester north of Leitrim Road between Limebank Road and Conroy Road. It also included part of the city of Nepean northeast of this line: Black Rapids Creek to Woodroffe Avenue to CN railway to Merivale Road.

The riding elected two members of the Legislative Assembly: Yvonne O'Neill, a Liberal from 1987 to 1995 and then Garry Guzzo, a Progressive Conservative from 1995 to 1999.

Election Results

References

Former provincial electoral districts of Ontario